Eudonia microdontalis is a moth in the family Crambidae. It was described by George Hampson in 1907. It is found in Japan, China (Gansu, Hubei, Hunan, Zhejiang) and Russia.

The wingspan is 16–22 mm. The forewings are white tinged with brown and irrorated with black. The antemedial line is double and filled with white. The hindwings are white, tinged with brown.

References

Moths described in 1907
Eudonia